Lipowa may refer to the following places in Poland:
Lipowa, Lower Silesian Voivodeship (south-west Poland)
Lipowa, Kuyavian-Pomeranian Voivodeship (north-central Poland)
Lipowa, Lesser Poland Voivodeship (south Poland)
Lipowa, Świętokrzyskie Voivodeship (south-central Poland)
Lipowa, Silesian Voivodeship (south Poland)
Lipowa, Brzeg County in Opole Voivodeship (south-west Poland)
Lipowa, Nysa County in Opole Voivodeship (south-west Poland)
Lipowa, Opole County in Opole Voivodeship (south-west Poland)
Lipowa, Warmian-Masurian Voivodeship (north Poland)